Mufid Abdulqader is a former Dallas Public Works and Transportation Department engineer, entrepreneurial investor, and music and skit performer who was convicted to 20 years of prison for raising funds for Hamas, on three separate conspiracy charges.

Early life and education
Abdulqader was born in 1960 the West Bank village Silwad, at the time a territory of Jordan.   Together with Abdulqader's half brother Khaled Mashal, his father moved the family to Kuwait afterwards for financial reasons, where Abdulqader, like his half-brother Khaled, completed high school.

Singing and skit performance career
Mufid performed for the band Al Sakhra ("The Rock").  It performed "stridently anti-Semitic" songs on coast-to-coast tours in the United States.  In addition to singing, Mufid performed skits on stage.  His band was afterwards called Al Nojoum.

Engineering career
Mufid won praise from Dallas Mayor Laura Miller during his tenure as a "rising star" in the Dallas Public Works and Transportation Department, where he worked on street design and sidewalk projects, and led the $4.8 million Bishop Arts District redevelopment in 2001.  By September 2003, he was Senior Project Manager.  Before Dallas, he worked at the Oklahoma Department of Transportation from 1988 to 1996.

Investments & entrepreneurship
Together with co-worker Mohammad Elyazgi, Abdulqader was a co-owner of Sinbad Greek & International Food in Oklahoma.

Holy Land Foundation
Abdulqader was a "top fundraiser" for the Holy Land Foundation, and was described by The New York Times as a "leader" of it.

Conviction and incarceration
In September 2008, prosecutors asked the judge for the dismissal of 29 counts each against Abdulqader and Abdulrahman Odeh, keeping only three conspiracy counts.
 
On October 29, 2012, the United States Supreme Court denied a petition for writ of certiorari; thus making Abdulqader's conviction final and definitive.  Nonetheless, the American Human Rights Council in 2017 asked for Mufid Abdulqader's conviction, as well as others, to be commuted to time already served by then-president B. H. Obama.

A 2011 NPR report claimed Abdulqader is imprisoned in a highly restrictive Communication Management Unit in Terre Haute, Indiana.

In 2018 Miko Peled published the book, Injustice: The Story of the Holy Land Foundation Five, where he catalogs the trial of the criminalization and dismantling of the Holy Land Foundation for Relief and Development, leading to the arrest and jailing of Foundation President Shukri Abu Baker, Chairman Ghassan Elashi, Mohammad el-Mezain, Mufid Abdulqader and Abdulraham Odeh.

Family
Abdulqader half-brother is Khaled Mashal, the  Palestinian political leader and the leader of the Islamic Palestinian organization Hamas who stepped down as Hamas' politburo chief in 2017.  Abdulqader's daughter Sarah Mufid Abdulqader has publicly asked for her father's freedom as well as of all Palestinian political prisoners in the United States.

References

1960 births
Living people
People from the West Bank
American male criminals
Kuwaiti emigrants to the United States
21st-century American criminals